This is a list of species in the predominantly crustose lichen genus Lecidea. They are commonly known as "disk lichens" or "tile lichens". A 2020 estimate placed about 100 species in the genus. , Species Fungorum accepts 121 species in Lecidea.

A

Lecidea aberrata 
Lecidea adnata 
Lecidea advertens 
Lecidea albofuscescens 
Lecidea albohyalina 
Lecidea antiloga 
Lecidea aptrootii 
Lecidea atrobrunnea 
Lecidea atromorio 
Lecidea aurantia 
Lecidea auriculata

B

Lecidea bacidioides 
Lecidea berengeriana 
Lecidea brodoana 
Lecidea brunneonigrescens 
Lecidea buellielloides

C
Lecidea callista 
Lecidea calpodes 
Lecidea campbellensis 
Lecidea canorufescens 
Lecidea capensis 
Lecidea cerarufa 
Lecidea cerviniicola 
Lecidea chlorocarpa 
Lecidea chloropolia 
Lecidea chondroides 
Lecidea commaculans 
Lecidea confluens 
Lecidea confluentula 
Lecidea contigua 
Lecidea convexa 
Lecidea coriacea  – Europe; North America
Lecidea crassilabra

D
Lecidea demolita 
Lecidea deplanaica 
Lecidea diducens

E
Lecidea endomelaena 
Lecidea erythrophaea 
Lecidea exigua

F

Lecidea flindersii 
Lecidea fuliginosa 
Lecidea fuscoatra 
Lecidea fuscoatrina 
Lecidea fuscoatrula

G
Lecidea globulispora 
Lecidea grisella 
Lecidea griseomarginata

H

Lecidea haerjedalica 
Lecidea hassei 
Lecidea haysomii 
Lecidea helvola 
Lecidea heppii 
Lecidea hercynica 
Lecidea herteliana 
Lecidea hoganii 
Lecidea holopolia 
Lecidea hypersporella 
Lecidea hypopta

I
Lecidea immarginata 
Lecidea inops 
Lecidea insulana 
Lecidea interjuncta 
Lecidea intersita 
Lecidea interstincta

K
Lecidea kalbii 
Lecidea keimioeensis 
Lecidea kingmanii

L

Lecidea laboriosa 
Lecidea lactea 
Lecidea lapicida 
Lecidea leprarioides 
Lecidea leptolomoides 
Lecidea lichenicola 
Lecidea lithophila 
Lecidea ludibunda 
Lecidea lygomma 
Lecidea lygommella 
Lecidea lygommoides

M

Lecidea macquariensis 
Lecidea mannii 
Lecidea meiospora 
Lecidea moritzii 
Lecidea mucosa 
Lecidea multiflora 
Lecidea mutabilis

N
Lecidea nylanderi

O
Lecidea obluridata 
Lecidea ochroleuca 
Lecidea oreophila  – California

P

Lecidea pallidoatra 
Lecidea paraclitica 
Lecidea paupercula 
Lecidea pelochroa 
Lecidea perlatolica 
Lecidea phaeophysata 
Lecidea phaeops 
Lecidea plana 
Lecidea polypycnidophora 
Lecidea porphyria 
Lecidea promiscens 
Lecidea promiscua 
Lecidea promixta

R
Lecidea racovitzae 
Lecidea rostrelensis 
Lecidea rubrocastanea  – western North America

S

Lecidea sarcogynoides 
Lecidea scabrida 
Lecidea schizopeltica 
Lecidea selenospora 
Lecidea siderolithica 
Lecidea silacea 
Lecidea stirtoniana 
Lecidea stratura  – United States
Lecidea streveleri 
Lecidea subassentiens 
Lecidea subcaerulea 
Lecidea subcinerascens 
Lecidea subfilamentosa 
Lecidea sublygomma 
Lecidea subplana 
Lecidea subsimilis 
Lecidea subspeirea 
Lecidea superjecta 
Lecidea swartzioidea 
Lecidea syncarpa

T

Lecidea tenella 
Lecidea terrena 
Lecidea tessellata 
Lecidea toensbergii 
Lecidea tragorum 
Lecidea trapelioides 
Lecidea turgidula

U
Lecidea umbonata 
Lecidea uniformis

W
Lecidea werthii

References

Lecidea